Anthony Belmonte (born 16 October 1995) is a French professional footballer who plays as a defensive midfielder for Greek Super League club Levadiakos.

Career
On 1 September 2017, Belmonte signed a three-year contract with Bulgarian club Levski Sofia.

In July 2019, Belmonte joined Grenoble Foot.

References

External links
 
 Profile at Levskisofia.info

1995 births
Living people
French footballers
Association football midfielders
Ligue 1 players
Ligue 2 players
First Professional Football League (Bulgaria) players
Super League Greece players
FC Istres players
Dijon FCO players
PFC Levski Sofia players
Grenoble Foot 38 players
Levadiakos F.C. players
French expatriate footballers
French expatriate sportspeople in Bulgaria
Expatriate footballers in Bulgaria
French expatriate sportspeople in Greece
Expatriate footballers in Greece